Boom Kah is the third studio album by Finnish singer Robin, released on 4 October 2013. The title track was released as the first single on 30 August 2013. The album peaked at number one on the Finnish Albums Chart. Boom Kah has sold over 83,000 copies since its release, earning a triple platinum certification.

Track listing

Charts and certifications

Charts

Certifications

Release history

See also
List of number-one albums of 2013 (Finland)

References

Albums produced by Jukka Immonen
2013 albums
Robin (singer) albums